Daniel Noel Drinkwater (born 5 March 1990) is an English professional footballer who plays as a midfielder.

Having come through the youth academy at Manchester United, he spent time on loan with Huddersfield Town, Cardiff City, Watford and Barnsley. He moved to Leicester City in 2012, where he was part of the Foxes side that was promoted to the top flight and later part of their Premier League title-winning team in 2016. Since moving to Chelsea in 2017 he has spent time on loan with Burnley, Aston Villa, Kasımpaşa and Reading.

Drinkwater has also played internationally for England at under-18, under-19 and senior levels, winning three caps in 2016 for the latter whilst a Leicester player.

Club career

Manchester United
Born in Manchester, Drinkwater joined the Manchester United academy at the age of nine, progressing through the ranks before earning a trainee contract in July 2006. In his first season at the club, Drinkwater became a regular in the Manchester United under-18 team, making 27 appearances and scoring two goals. He received his first taste of reserve team action that same season, coming off the bench to replace Ritchie Jones in a 5–2 Premier Reserve League win at home to Wigan Athletic. The following season, Drinkwater consolidated his position in the under-18s team while increasing his presence in the reserves. In the 2008 Lancashire Senior Cup final against Liverpool on 31 July 2008, Drinkwater came on as a 56th-minute substitute for Rodrigo Possebon before scoring the winning goal three minutes from full-time. In the 2008–09 season, Drinkwater became a regular in the reserve team, making 18 appearances and getting on the scoresheet twice.

At the end of the season, he was called up to the Manchester United first team for their dead rubber league match against Hull City on 24 May 2009. He was named on the bench, but did not take to the field.

Loans
To gain first-team experience, on 14 August 2009, Drinkwater joined Huddersfield Town on loan for the duration of the 2009–10 season. He made his debut for the club the very next day, coming on in the 72nd minute for Gary Roberts in a 3–1 win at home to Southampton. His first goal for Huddersfield came three days later in a 7–1 home win over Brighton & Hove Albion, five minutes after coming on as a 64th-minute substitute. He made his first start for Huddersfield in a 1–0 defeat at Bristol Rovers on 22 August.

On 8 July 2010, Manchester United agreed for Drinkwater to spend a season-long loan spell at Cardiff City. As they were under a transfer embargo at the time, Cardiff said that the move would be completed once this had been lifted. The move was eventually confirmed on 6 August 2010, once the embargo had been removed. Drinkwater's competitive debut for Cardiff two days later, in their 1–1 home draw with Sheffield United on the opening day of the 2010–11 Football League season.

Despite the loan having originally been intended to last the entire season, Manchester United recalled Drinkwater from Cardiff on 25 January 2011. During his time with Cardiff, Drinkwater made 12 appearances, including nine in the Championship.

Just three days after his return to Manchester United, Drinkwater joined Watford on 28 January 2011 on loan until the end of the season.

On 23 August 2011, Drinkwater joined Barnsley on loan until 2 January 2012, which was later extended until 30 June 2012. He made 17 Championship appearances for the Tykes, scoring in a 5–3 loss at his former team Cardiff on 22 October.

Leicester City

On 20 January 2012, Drinkwater joined Leicester City from Manchester United for an undisclosed fee.

After being named Championship Player of the Month for December 2013, he was also one of three players who received a nomination for the Championship Player of the Year Award. Drinkwater had his most successful year as a professional, scoring seven goals and being named to the PFA Championship Team of the Year alongside teammates Kasper Schmeichel and Wes Morgan, as Leicester were promoted to the Premier League after winning the Championship. On 17 June 2014, Drinkwater signed a new four-year deal with Leicester after helping the Foxes win promotion to the Premier League for the first time in ten years.

Drinkwater played consistently as the Foxes won the Premier League title in 2015–16, alongside his midfield partners N'Golo Kanté, Marc Albrighton and Riyad Mahrez. He scored his first top-flight goal on 23 January 2016, to open a 3–0 win over Stoke City at the King Power Stadium.

On 25 August 2016, Drinkwater signed a contract to remain with the club until 2021.

Chelsea
On 1 September 2017, Drinkwater signed for Premier League champions Chelsea on a five-year contract, for a £35 million fee. Due to a thigh injury that ruled him out previously, he made his debut on 25 October in the last 16 of the EFL Cup, playing an hour of a 2–1 home win over Everton. Drinkwater made his first Premier League start for the Blues in a 1–1 draw against Liverpool at Anfield on 25 November. On 30 December, he scored his first and only goal for Chelsea, a well-executed half volley, in a 5–0 home win over Stoke City. His first season at Chelsea saw him make 22 appearances in all competitions, including four in the Blues' triumphant FA Cup campaign. However, injury meant Drinkwater was not involved in the final, against his old club Manchester United.

With the arrival of new manager Maurizio Sarri, Drinkwater made no league appearances at all in the 2018–19 season. His only appearance in all competitions was during the 2018 FA Community Shield against Manchester City in August 2018.

Loan to Burnley
Drinkwater signed for Premier League club Burnley on 8 August 2019 on loan until 6 January 2020. He made his Burnley debut on 28 August 2019, in a 3–1 EFL Cup defeat to Sunderland.

On 31 August 2019, he was allegedly attacked outside a nightclub, resulting in injury and two weeks out-of-action. He did not make his league debut until 3 December, in a 4–1 loss to Manchester City. Drinkwater was unable to get back into the team after that game, and on 3 January 2020, Burnley manager Sean Dyche confirmed that Burnley would not extend his loan and he would return to Chelsea.

Loan to Aston Villa 
On 7 January 2020, Drinkwater signed for Aston Villa on loan until the end of the 2019–20 season. Aston Villa manager Dean Smith watched Drinkwater train with the team before confirming his loan deal. Smith stated that he was confident that Drinkwater had put the issues that had affected his previous loan behind him and he would be ready to provide cover for the injured John McGinn. On 11 March, Drinkwater was told to leave Aston Villa's training ground following an altercation with teammate Jota, in which Drinkwater reportedly directed a headbutt at the player.

Return to Chelsea
In May, ESPN named Drinkwater's move to Chelsea as the second-worst transfer in Premier League history, behind only Ali Dia's move to Southampton. Drinkwater was not allocated a squad number for the 2020–21 season, with his former number 6 allocated to new signing Thiago Silva. In an interview with The Telegraph in September 2020, Drinkwater spoke of his off-field issues and stated his desire to get his career back on track, including the possibility of playing abroad.

Loan to Kasımpaşa 
On 18 January 2021, Drinkwater signed for Turkish club Kasımpaşa on loan until the end of the season. He made his debut as a substitute against Göztepe on 28 February.

Loan to Reading 
On 30 August 2021, Drinkwater joined Reading on loan until the end of the season. He scored his first goal for the club on 27 November 2021 in a 3–2 win against Swansea City.

Chelsea announced on 10 June 2022 that Drinkwater would leave the club when his contract expired at the end of June.

International career
Drinkwater made his debut for the England under-18 team in their 2–0 win over Ghana, where he scored the second goal of the match. His second under-18 cap came in a 2–0 win over Austria.

He also made appearances for the England under-19s between 2008 and 2009. His first appearance came in their match against Albania on 8 October 2008. His final appearance for the England under-19s came against Ukraine on 2 August 2009.

He was called up to the full England squad for the first time on 17 March 2016, ahead of friendlies against Germany and the Netherlands. He made his debut 12 days later in the latter match, a 2–1 loss at Wembley Stadium in which he was man of the match. Drinkwater was named in Roy Hodgson's 26-man provisional squad for UEFA Euro 2016 but was one of three players axed for the final selection.

Personal life
In April 2019, Drinkwater was charged with drink-driving after crashing his Range Rover into a wall in Mere, Cheshire. There were two other passengers in the car at the time of the accident, who were treated for minor injuries. Drinkwater appeared at Stockport Magistrates' Court on 13 May, where he pleaded guilty to drink-driving and received a 20-month driving ban.

In September 2019, Drinkwater was attacked outside a Manchester nightclub, allegedly following a dispute with fellow footballer Kgosi Ntlhe, which resulted in ankle ligament damage.

Career statistics

Club

International

Honours
Leicester City
 Premier League: 2015–16
 Football League Championship: 2013–14

Chelsea
 FA Cup: 2017–18

England U19
 UEFA European Under-19 Championship runner-up: 2009

Individual
 PFA Team of the Year: 2013–14 Championship
 Football League Championship Player of the Month: December 2013
 Leicester City Player of the Season: 2013–14
 Leicester City Goal of the Season: 2013–14

References

External links

Profile  at the Chelsea F.C. website

1990 births
Living people
Footballers from Manchester
English footballers
England youth international footballers
England international footballers
Association football midfielders
Manchester United F.C. players
Huddersfield Town A.F.C. players
Cardiff City F.C. players
Watford F.C. players
Barnsley F.C. players
Leicester City F.C. players
Chelsea F.C. players
Burnley F.C. players
Aston Villa F.C. players
Kasımpaşa S.K. footballers
Reading F.C. players
English Football League players
Premier League players
English expatriate footballers
Expatriate footballers in Turkey
English expatriate sportspeople in Turkey